In December 1816, a special election was held in Georgia's  to fill a vacancy left by the resignation of Alfred Cuthbert (DR) on November 9.  Cuthbert himself had been elected in a special election in 1813.

Election results

Cook took his seat in Congress on January 23, 1817.

See also
List of special elections to the United States House of Representatives

References

Georgia 1816 At-large
Georgia 1816 At-large
1816 At-large
Georgia At-large
1816 Georgia (U.S. state) elections
United States House of Representatives 1816 at-large